Statesville may refer to the following places in the United States:

 Statesville, North Carolina
 Statesville, Tennessee

See also 
 Stateville Correctional Center